The following is an incomplete list of current American football stadiums ranked by capacity. All stadiums in the list are located in the United States. The list contains the home stadiums of all 32 professional teams playing in the NFL as well as the largest stadiums used by college football teams in the NCAA. The largest stadium used by a professional team falls at number 15 on the list. Not included are several large stadiums used by teams in the now-defunct NFL Europa, as these were all built for and used mainly for association football, or Rogers Centre, located in Canada (although it does host occasional American football games). Currently American football stadiums with a capacity of 25,000 or more are included.

Stadiums are ordered by seating capacity.  This is intended to represent the permanent fixed seating capacity, when the stadium is configured for football.  Some stadiums can accommodate larger crowds when configured for other sports, or by using temporary seating or allowing standing-room only attendance.

Current list

Former or demolished stadiums 

|}

American football stadiums outside of the United States

 Eintracht-Stadion, Germany, 24,406
 Friedrich-Ludwig-Jahn-Sportpark, Germany, 19,708
 Estadio Gaspar Mass, Mexico, 16,000
 Stadion Olimpijski, Poland, 11,000
 Estadio Borregos, Mexico, 10,057

See also
Map of NCAA Division I FBS football stadiums
List of current National Football League stadiums
List of NCAA Division I FBS football stadiums
List of NCAA Division I FCS football stadiums
List of U.S. stadiums by capacity
List of American baseball stadiums by capacity
List of North American stadiums by capacity
List of stadiums by capacity
List of football (soccer) stadiums by capacity
List of rugby league stadiums by capacity
List of rugby union stadiums by capacity

References

Capacity
American football
American football venues
American football stadiums